Joaquín Menini (born 18 August 1991) is an Argentine field hockey player who plays as a forward for Dutch Hoofdklasse club Rotterdam and the Spanish national team.

He was part of the Argentine team that won gold in men's field hockey at the 2016 Summer Olympics in Rio de Janeiro.

International career

Argentina
He made his debut for the Argentina national team in 2011 in a Champions Challenge's tournament played in South Africa. He won his first gold medal in 2014 South American Games. Menini was part of the Argentina squad that won the bronze medal 2014 World Cup, he also played at the 2018 World Cup.

Spain
Due to having a Spanish passport alongside his Argentinian one he was eligible to play for Spain in February 2022 after not having played for Argentina for three years. He made his debut for Spain against England on 4 February 2022.

Club career
Menini played in Argentina for Club Ferrocarril Mitre before he moved to Europe in 2014 to play for Club de Campo in Madrid, Spain. He played there until 2016, when he moved to the Netherlands to play for HGC in Wassenaar. After having played one year for them he transferred to another Dutch club, HC Den Bosch where he signed a contract extension in 2018. In July 2020 it was announced he signed for Rotterdam for the 2020–21 season.

References

External links

Living people
1991 births
Argentine male field hockey players
Spanish male field hockey players
Olympic field hockey players of Argentina
Male field hockey forwards
2014 Men's Hockey World Cup players
Field hockey players at the 2015 Pan American Games
Field hockey players at the 2016 Summer Olympics
2018 Men's Hockey World Cup players
Olympic medalists in field hockey
Medalists at the 2016 Summer Olympics
Olympic gold medalists for Argentina
Pan American Games medalists in field hockey
Pan American Games gold medalists for Argentina
South American Games gold medalists for Argentina
South American Games medalists in field hockey
HC Den Bosch players
Club de Campo Villa de Madrid players
HGC players
HC Rotterdam players
Competitors at the 2014 South American Games
Men's Hoofdklasse Hockey players
División de Honor de Hockey Hierba players
Field hockey players from Buenos Aires
Expatriate field hockey players
Argentine expatriate sportspeople in the Netherlands
Argentine expatriate sportspeople in Spain
Medalists at the 2015 Pan American Games
2023 Men's FIH Hockey World Cup players
21st-century Argentine people